Discophora is a genus of trees in the family Stemonuraceae. There are two species, Discophora guianensis and Discophora montana. The plants occur in the Neotropics.

Stemonuraceae
Asterid genera